Monterey Bay Roller Derby (MBRD), formerly Monterey Bay Derby Dames, is a women's flat track roller derby league based in Monterey, California. Founded in 2010, the league consists of two teams which compete against teams from other leagues, and the league is a member of the Women's Flat Track Derby Association (WFTDA).

History
The league was founded in April 2010 by three skaters associated with the Santa Cruz Derby Girls but living in Monterey, who wanted to play for a more local league. It played its first bout in February 2011, attracting more than 500 fans.

In July 2011, Monterey Bay was accepted as an apprentice member of the Women's Flat Track Derby Association. In December 2013, the league was accepted as a full member WFTDA league.

Monterey Bay Derby Dames changed their name to Monterey Bay Roller Derby in 2019. Their home rink, Water City, closed during the COVID-19 pandemic shutdowns. Former teams include Babes of Wrath, Steinwreckers and the Dread Ponies (junior). 

According to California Derby Galaxy, MBRD will compete in the Quasars division for the 2023 season.

WFTDA rankings

References

Roller derby leagues established in 2010
Roller derby leagues in California
Monterey, California
2010 establishments in California